Parornix maura is a moth of the family Gracillariidae. It is known from Algeria and Morocco.

References

Parornix
Moths of Africa
Moths described in 1998